Ictal bradycardia is when people with temporal lobe epilepsy experience bradycardia with their seizures (epileptic discharges). Bradycardia is defined by a slower than normal heart rate, less than 60 bpm. (Normal range is 60-100 bpm).

Ictal epileptic discharges can effect changes in cardiac rhythm. An increase in heart rhythm is common during seizures. This type of epileptic seizure is known as ictal tachycardia, in which the subject's heart rate increase of more than 10 beats per minute of above the baseline. In comparison, ictal bradycardia causes epileptic discharges that disrupt the normal cardiac rhythm in a negative fashion. Slowing the heart beat down by more than 10 beats per minute below the average baseline. 

Ictal bradycardia is a potential cause or reason for ictal asystole to occur and is believed to help explain the phenomenon of sudden unexpected death in epilepsy (SUDEP).Through the simultaneous use of electroencephalograph (EEG) and electrocardiograms (ECG), researchers can monitor and record a patient going through ictal bradycardia seizures. And most importantly provide treatment with both antiepileptic drugs and cardiac pace as deemed necessary for the patient. Although there is  limited amount of information about ictal bradycardia, as it is a relatively new discovery and is considered to be rare condition, researchers suggest that early diagnosis and treatment of ictal bradycardia can eliminate the chances of sudden unexpected death in epilepsy.

References

Cardiac arrhythmia
Epilepsy types